Abies nordmanniana subsp. equi-trojani, synonym Abies bornmuelleriana, the Turkish fir is a rare, coniferous evergreen tree native to northwest Turkey.  Another common name is Uludağ fir. It is a subspecies of Abies nordmanniana. It has also been considered to be a natural hybrid between Caucasian fir (Abies nordmanniana) and Grecian fir (Abies cephalonica). 

On the back of its foliage, the Turkish fir has a silvery hue, exposed as a result of the upward growth habit of its needles. This characteristic makes the tree, along with its pleasant fragrance, a common ornamental. 

Turkish fir is typically a narrow and conical tree, with a mature height of 20 to 30 meters (60 to 100 feet), and growing 1.8 to 4 meters (6 to 28 feet) wide. It has dense, dark green upswept needles 2.5 to 3 cm (1 to 1.2 inches) long. Seed cones are purplish-brown and 10 to 14.5 cm (4 to 5.8 inches) long.

Its native range is in northwestern Turkey, including the western Pontic Mountains south of the Black Sea, and Uludağ and other mountains southeast of the Sea of Marmara.

References

External links
 Abies bornmuelleriana. Distribution map, genetic conservation units and related resources. European Forest Genetic Resources Programme (EUFORGEN)

nordmanniana subsp. equi-trojani
Natural history of Anatolia
Trees of Turkey